Alberto Martín Gómez (born 26 January 1983 in Mendoza) is an Argentine football forward.

Career
Gómez began his playing career in Mexico with Monarcas Morelia in 2001. He returned to his home province of Mendoza in 2005 to play for Independiente Rivadavia where he played until 2009.

Gómez joined Club Atlético Independiente of the Primera División in 2009. He made his debut for the club on 3 September 2009 in a 2-0 home win against Godoy Cruz. He soon established himself as a regular first team player and scored his first Primera División goal in a 0-3 away win over San Lorenzo on 15 November 2009.

Honours
Independiente
Copa Sudamericana (1): 2010

External links
 
 
 

1983 births
Living people
Sportspeople from Mendoza, Argentina
Argentine footballers
Argentine expatriate footballers
Association football forwards
Atlético Morelia players
Independiente Rivadavia footballers
Club Atlético Independiente footballers
Club Atlético Tigre footballers
Deportes Iquique footballers
C.D. Antofagasta footballers
Deportivo Maipú players
Racing de Córdoba footballers
Chilean Primera División players
Liga MX players
Argentine Primera División players
Primera Nacional players
Torneo Federal A players
Torneo Argentino A players
Torneo Argentino B players
Argentine expatriate sportspeople in Chile
Argentine expatriate sportspeople in Mexico
Argentine expatriate sportspeople in Ecuador
Expatriate footballers in Chile
Expatriate footballers in Mexico
Expatriate footballers in Ecuador